Bhati Gate (Bhati Darwaza)  is one of the historic thirteen gates of the Walled City of Lahore in Lahore, Punjab, Pakistan. Bhati Gate also serves as a union council located in the Ravi Zone. 

The gate is located near Data Darbar and is similar in design to Kashmiri Gate.

Background
Bhati Gate entrance is located on the western wall of the Old City. It is one of the two oldest entry points into the Walled City which controlled the only major north-south thoroughfare during Ghaznavid period. The gate is said to be named after the Bhati Clan of Rajputs.

History

It is Named After Great Bhati Rajput Warriors. When Emperor Akbar expanded the city eastward and divided it into nine districts, Bhati Gate and its bazar marked the boundary between Mubarak Khan in the east, and Talwarra in the west.

The famed poet Allama Iqbal lived in a house near Bhati gate between 1901 and 1905.

Environs

Bhati Gate is known historically as a centre for arts and literature in Old Lahore. The area inside the gate is well known throughout the city for its food. Just outside Bhati Gate is Data Durbar, the mausoleum of the Sufi saint Ali Hajweri (also known as Data Sahib Ganjbaksh). Every Thursday evening musicians used to gather here to perform Qawwali music, though these are sometimes replaced with Naats and religious sermons.

The gate serves as the starting point for Lahore's Hakiman Bazaar, and is located near the Fakir Khana Museum. Near the gate is also located the Old City's Oonchi Mosque. Bhati Gate also serves as Union Council 29 (UC 29) in Tehsil Ravi of Lahore City District.

Gallery

See also 
 Lahore
 Lahore Fort
 Walled City of Lahore
 Badshahi Mosque

References

External links 

 Walled City Has thirteen gates - archived website
 Islamic Web Sites About Hazrat Data Ganj Bakhsh

Gates of Lahore
Ravi Zone